Markese Money Rolle (born April 1, 1991), known professionally as SpaceGhostPurrp, is an American rapper and record producer from Miami, Florida. He was the founder of the American hip hop group Raider Klan and Black Money Boys.

Famous Raider Klan members and associates include Denzel Curry, Robb Banks, Pouya, Chris Travis, Yung Simmie and Xavier Wulf. SGP gathered a following in the underground hip hop scene through mixtapes, producing, and his work with other underground artists. He has produced tracks for Juicy J, Lil Uzi Vert, Wiz Khalifa, Robb Banks, ASAP Mob & Lil Tracy, among others. On June 12, 2012, his debut studio album Mysterious Phonk: Chronicles of SpaceGhostPurrp was released. Since 2012, SpaceGhostPurrp has released over 60 mixtapes and EP's. He has since became well known for his eccentric and controversial public persona.

Early life
SpaceGhostPurrp was born in the neighborhood of Carol City in Miami, Florida. He began rapping at age 5 and producing at age 13, attended Silver Trail Middle School in Pembroke Pines and Everglades High School in Miramar. He is of Bahamian and Cuban descent.

Music career

2008–2011: Beginnings and Blackland Radio 66.6
In high school, SpaceGhostPurrp began skateboarding frequently but later decided that he wanted to pursue a career in music. He worked to graduate from high school early. SpaceGhostPurrp began uploading music once he created his YouTube channel "Spaceeghostpurrpmj23" on May 23, 2010. SpaceGhostPurrp's early releases contained series of visuals that included Purrped & Chopped songs containing visuals with 70/80s soul-train aesthetics, Purrped & chopped Toro y Moi songs & even a Kreayshawn music video.

In August, 2010 SpaceGhostPurrp began working on NASA: The Mixtape. SpaceGhostPurrp formed hip-hop collective Raider Klan in 2008 along with Dough Dough Da Don, Kadafi, Muney Junior, and Jitt. Jitt died in 2010. SpaceGhostPurrp recruited various rap artists to Raider Klan, including Denzel Curry, Yung Simmie, Nell, Chris Travis, Xavier Wulf, Rell, Amber London, and Key Nyata, among many others.

At the tail end of 2010 and early 2011, SpaceGhostPurrp began collaborating with Lil Ugly Mane. Which led to Ugly Mane doing the artwork for his album Blackland Radio 66.6, Around that same time, SpaceGhostPurrp began working on the mixtape Blackland Radio 66.6 mixtape.

After Blackland Radio 66.6 was released on May 1, 2011, a few weeks later SpaceGhostPurrp announced he was working on five mixtapes that were all to be released in 2011 called MIND OF PURRP, SUMMA PHONK VOL.ONE, TRILLUMINATTI, BLVCK MVRDOC, and a collaboration project with Mishka NYC called SON OF EYE. SpaceGhostPurrp dropped singles for all these mixtapes, however, he never released these mixtapes due to his change of direction once he landed & stayed in New York to begin collaborating with the ASAP Mob. In the summer of 2011, SpaceGhostPurrp was also working with fellow rappers Speak! and Juicy J.

SpaceGhostPurrp went on to NY in August 2011 to live and work with members from the ASAP Mob. In late September 2011, SpaceGhostPurrp announced he was dismissing Trilluminatti and now was working on a new mixtape to be called GOD OF BLVCK. This mixtape was released in February 2012.

2012–2013: Mysterious Phonk: The Chronicles of SpaceGhostPurrp
In early 2012 SpaceGhostPurrp signed a one-off record deal with British indie label 4AD and began remixing tracks from his earlier mix tapes for his debut album. Most of his early songs feature samples from sources such as train whistles, female porn stars, and drops from the soundtrack of the Mortal Kombat video game, as well as other video game series. In addition to his own songs, he also produces beats for other artists (mostly those in the Raider Klan), but has made beats for other people as well. He produced one track titled T.A.P. for Taylor Allderdice, a mixtape by Wiz Khalifa as well as "Keep it G" & "Pretty Flacko" for ASAP Rocky.

His debut album, titled Mysterious Phonk: Chronicles of SpaceGhostPurrp, was released on June 12, 2012, and consists of mostly remixed tracks from previous mixtapes. He occasionally worked with rapper Juicy J and has produced a number of tracks from Juicy J's "Blue Dream & Lean". He also guest stars on Juicy J's "Deez Bitches Rollin'" with rapper fellow Speakz. SpaceGhostPurrp also featured on Domo Genesis's & The Alchemist's debut collaboration album "No Idols" on the track "Daily News" (also featuring Earl Sweatshirt & Action Bronson), as well as Freddie Gibbs' "Kush Cloud" along with Krayzie Bone.

SpaceGhostPurrp revealed in an interview that there is an upcoming project between him and rap group Odd Future, which has supported him by playing his music at shows since he released the mixtape BLACKLAND RADIO 66.6.
On July 16, 2012, SpaceGhostPurrp began his first tour with hardcore punk band Trash Talk. The mini tour lasted from July 16 to 23rd - performing four shows in California, one in Oregon, and two in Washington. His song "The Black God" was named #46 on Pitchfork's 50 best songs of 2012 list. He also performed in Miami during Ultra Music Festival on March 17, 2013, alongside fellow Raider Klan members Yung Simmie and Klan Rico.

2014–2015: Intoxxxicated and other projects
On January 19, 2014, SpaceGhostPurrp released a compilation titled 58 Blunts of Purrp, consisting of his own songs, hard to find tracks, and some he either produced or had a feature on. On February 28, 2014, SpaceGhostPurrp released an 18-track mixtape called B.M.W. 2: IntoXXXicated, which included no features and returned to the lo-fi sound of his earlier mixtapes. Subsequently, he released a slightly different version of "B.M.W. 2: IntoXXXicated" that had tempos of certain songs changed, and while the overall sound quality was slightly improved it still retained much of the lo-fi qualities as before. A few months later it was remastered, had some tracks removed, a new track added, and released as an album on iTunes under the name IntoXXXicated.

Early in 2015, SpaceGhostPurrp released two new projects, the first of which was titled Dark Angel and released on January 13. The second project, a 5-track EP called Money Mendoza was released on January 25. Later that year, SpaceGhostPurrp left Miami, and moved to Atlanta, where he made music with artists such as Father and OG Maco. In April 2015, SpaceGhostPurrp released two compilations.

One was titled VENENO, it being an extended version of the EP released earlier that year, and the other was titled PYRO Era, consisting mostly of loose tracks released in 2014 and 2015. On the 9th of May, a new EP called Richest Revenge under the moniker, Money Mendoza, was released through his Instagram account. In May 2015, Raider Klan released Raider Klan Records: The Mixtape which featured some production and vocals from SpaceGhostPurrp.

On June 24, 2015, Dej Loaf released a song featuring Young Thug titled "Shawty", co-produced by Young Roc which featured a sample of the song "RAIDER PRAYER"'s instrumental off of SpaceGhostPurrp's album Mysterious Phonk: The Chronicles of SPACEGHOSTPURRP. SpaceGhostPurrp was uncredited by the producer resulting in a minor conflict via Twitter which was soon resolved peacefully.

2016–present: Blackland Radio 66.6 2 and 3

On May 9, 2016, SpaceGhostPurrp released a mixtape entitled Blackland Radio 66.6 Pt. 2. exclusively on Datpiff. He had stated that he had plans to release subsequent volumes under Part 2, but eventually opted to skip straight to the release of Blackland Radio 3 on March 4, 2018. Initially overlooked, Blackland Radio 66.6 Pt. 2. is now widely considered one of SpaceGhostPurrp's best projects.

As 2016 concluded, Tiny Mix Tapes recognized SpaceGhostPurrp's Black Money Boys Death Row (BMB) collective as one of its favorite labels for 2016, noting that:

In early 2017,  SpaceGhostPurrp signed a deal with label Yeah We On Entertainment, LLC, with the label distributing previously released works by SpaceGhostPurrp under its name.

Influences 
SpaceGhostPurrp has listed many artists as an influence, which include Kanye West, Wiz Khalifa, Gucci Mane, Poison Clan, Paris, Three 6 Mafia, UGK, Bone Thugs-N-Harmony, Big L, Eazy-E, 2Pac, and DJ Screw.

He has collaborated with many of his influences, namely Juicy J on his mixtape "Blue Dream & Lean" released in 2012. SpaceGhostPurrp often attributes his dark "phonk" sound to the dangerous and violent environment he grew up around in Carol City which he refers to as "Blackland", linking it with his references to hell, and the satanic symbolism in his critically acclaimed mixtape Blackland Radio 66.6.

He as well as other Raider Klan members have made references to the shooting of Trayvon Martin, and he has made a tribute song titled "No Evidence" which was released on his album "Mysterious Phonk: The Chronicles of SpaceGhostPurrp". SpaceGhostPurrp has also stated he is a big fan of extreme metal bands such as Meshuggah.

His name is derived from that of the central character of Hanna-Barbera's 1966 TV series Space Ghost and its 1994 parody talk show spinoff Space Ghost Coast to Coast.

Personal life 
In a YouTube stream on August 25, 2019, that was later re-uploaded, Rolle revealed that he is on the autism spectrum.

Controversies 
In late 2011, ASAP Yams, an A&R artist and co-founder of the then-independent ASAP Mob artist collective, discovered SpaceGhostPurrp and his music through Tumblr. Yams told SpaceGhostPurrp he enjoyed his Blackland Radio 66.6 mixtape and invited him to join up with ASAP Mob in New York City. SpaceGhostPurrp began producing music for ASAP Rocky who was a big fan of SpaceGhostPurrp's music, including "Keep it G" from Rocky's breakout mixtape, Live. Love. A$AP.

SpaceGhostPurrp and ASAP Mob remained friends until SpaceGhostPurrp had an argument with ASAP Twelvyy on Twitter in December 2011. This led to Rocky dissing Raider Klan on a song called "Yao Ming (Remix)". That release from Rocky furthered the Twitter fight between SpaceGhostPurrp and ASAP Mob, but the fight was short lived when other ASAP Mob members spoke for SpaceGhostPurrp's sake.

About a week afterward, Rocky dropped "Pretty Flacko" as a shout-out to the Trillwave genre and SpaceGhostPurrp. SpaceGhostPurrp and ASAP Mob members were on good terms again up until April 2012 when ASAP Mob played an unreleased SpaceGhostPurrp track at Coachella, leading to another short-lived argument ending on bad terms, this time between SpaceGhostPurrp and ASAP Yams. Through the rest of 2012 and early 2013, ASAP Mob used some of SpaceGhostPurrp's music production without giving him credit to make the tracks "I Need Money" (which later became "Max Julien") and "Suddenly" by ASAP Rocky.

The feud was quiet and they seemed to be on good terms until former Raider Klan member Stoops was assaulted by ASAP Twelvyy in June 2012. This caused the feud between SpaceGhostPurrp and Twelvyy to reach its peak and eventually extend to the entirety of Raider Klan and ASAP Mob. The feud quickly turned physical in November 2012 when affiliates of Raider Klan alongside SpaceGhostPurrp attacked members of ASAP Mob outside Miami. This led to ASAP Nast calling the police and SpaceGhostPurrp being arrested.

In March 2013, SpaceGhostPurrp and affiliates once again attacked ASAP Mob in their home city of New York. The feud quickly began to die down in terms of aggression and took to social media. According to SpaceGhostPurrp, the feud with ASAP Mob was resolved before the death of ASAP Yams in 2015, but ASAP Bari prevented SpaceGhostPurrp and ASAP from reuniting, thus perpetuating the conflict.

Discography

Studio albums 
 Mysterious Phonk: Chronicles of SpaceGhostPurrp (2012)

Extended plays 
 Why So Serious (as Muney Jordan) (2009)
 Larry Bird Season (2014)
 Dark Angel (as SpaceGhoztPurrp) (2015)
 Money Mendoza (2015)
 Richest Revenge (as Money Mendoza) (2015)
 Blackland Radio 666: Pt. 2 - Episode 1 (as SpaceGhostPurrp AKA Purrple Haze) (2016)
 New Season 2K17 (2016)
 Richest Revenge 2 (2017)
 Winter's Mine 4 (2017)
 Angry America (2017)
 Miami Music Pistol Music Homicide Music ( Miami Dade County 2017 ) (as SpaceGhostPurrp Da Lean Plug) (2017)
 Qream  (2017) 
 Overkill 2 (2017)
 Enemies (2017)
 Underworld (with Spookyli) (2017)
 Florida Baby (2017)
 Florida Stick Drill (2017)
 Bal Harbour (2018)
 Lil Vamp (2018)
 Blood Moon (as Vampire Money) (2018)

Mixtapes 
 Wavvy Chronicles (as Muney Jordan) (2010)
 NASA: The Mixtape (2010)
  Purpped & Chopped (2011)
 BLVCKLVND RVDIX 66.6 (1991) (2011)
 CLVB NVZV 1995: Purrped & Chopped (2011)
 GXX XX BXXXK Volume. 1 (2012)
 B.M.W. (2012)
 The Winter's Mine (2013)
 B.M.W. 2: IntoXXXicated (2014)
 NASA Gang (Remastered) (2014)
 Dark Angels (Bonus Tracks) (2015)
 Dark Angel Instrumentals (2015)
 Winter's Mine 2 (2015)
 Veneno (2015)
 Winter's Mine 3 (2015)
 Chopped by Purrp (2016)
 Blackland Radio 66.6 Pt. 2 - Episode 1 (2016)
 Blood Red Moet (2016)
 Overkill (2016)
 Purrple Haze (as Purrple Haze) (2016)
 God of Black EP Vol. 2 - The X-Tacy Tape (2016)
 ICX CRXVM DXMXN 1.8 (with Spookyli) (2017)
 Winter‘s Mine 5 (as Vamp Money) (2017)
 Vampire Life The Mixtape (Free Jim Jones Mixtape) (2018)
 Rihanna's Baby Daddy (2018)
 Gladiator Season (Volume 1) (with TrippJones) (2018)
 Florida Flame Part 1 (2018)
 Welcome to Vampland (with Spookyli) (2019)
 MarDragon+ (2018)
 Please Don't Wake Me; I Am Exhausted (with XVNИ¥) (2019)
 Dragon Nigga No Slime (2019)
 Florida Finna Kill Da Whole World (Miami Dade County 305) (2019)
 SpaceGhostPussy Response ( End of ASAP Rocky AKA ASAP Sissy Pony ) (2020)
 COVAMP (2020)
 Z-REX 3005 (2020)

Mixes 
  Nate Dogg: Purrped & Chopped (2011)
 Alize Mix (2012)
 P Y R O MIXX 2015 (2015)
 Goth Money Talibanz 2015 Mix (2015)
 December Mixx (2015)
 BLVCK MVNXXY JXRDVN MIXX (with BMB Loko Los) (2016)
 The New Wave: 2k16-HotBoyz (2016)
 Terror Gang: Dark Riddim (2018)
 Ashview Heights Legend (as SpaceGhoztPurrp) (2019)
 Northside Drive Zone 2 ATL 2020 (as Money AKA SpaceGhostPurrp) (2020)
 DJ MIXX 1 (As DJ VAMPIRE MONEY) (2021)

Compilations 
 NASA Underground - Lost Tapes: 1991–'93 (2010)
 NASA Underground - Lost Tapes: 1994–'96 (2010)
 NASA Underground - Lost Tapes: 1997–2000 (2011)
 Blvck Phonk (2012)
 Best of S.G.P.: Sizzurp Tape (2013)
 58 Blunts of Purrp (2014)

Guest appearances

Production discography

2011 

 Lil Ugly Mane - Doing Badass Improvisational Stuff Rag For Piano 
 "Throw Dem Gunz (2011 unreleased rough unfinished first demo version)"

 A$AP Rocky - LIVE.LOVE.A$AP
 09. "Keep It G" (featuring Chace Infinite and SpaceGhostPurrp)

 Sortahuman - Lysergic Bliss  
07. "Stonergang" (featuring Main Attrakionz)

 A$AP Ant - 
 "BLVCK TVPE" (featuring Spaceghostpurrp)

 A$AP Twelvyy - 
 "Dope Sample"

 Sortahuman - Stonergang 
 01. "The Anthem" 
 02. "Early Morning" (featuring Dizzy D and J.K. The Reaper) 
 05. "Where They Do That At"  
 12. "Nothin But The Best" (featuring Dizzy D)

2012 

 A$AP Rocky -
 "Pretty Flacko"

 Denzel Curry - King of the Mischievous South, Vol. 1
 02. "Headcrack"
 04. "Phantazm '96" 
 05. "Gankin 1993-1995" (featuring J.K. The Reaper)
 15. "Raider Klan Phonk Freestyle" (featuring Ruben Slikk and SpaceGhostPurrp)

 Yung Simmie - G Funk Resurrection 1993-1995 
 11. "Captain Planet (Rvidxr Klvn Purrp Tribute ‘94)"

 Wiz Khalifa - Taylor Allderdice
 12. "T.A.P." (featuring Juicy J)

 J.K. The Reaper - Ill Life 
 15. "Gankin'" (featuring Denzel Curry)
 17. "Son of Sam"

 Amber London - 1994 EP 
 07. "Low MF Key"

 Metro Zu - HEAVEN 
 07. "Cyberpunk Phonk"

 Robb Banks - 
 "Look Like Basquiat" (produced with Rah)

 Denzel Curry - Strictly 4 My R.V.I.D.X.R.Z. 
 11. "Headcrack" (featuring Yung Simmie) 
 13. "Ridin n Da Back" (featuring Amber London and Xavier Wulf) 
 16. "Son of Sam (Fang Tribute)" 
 17. "Headcrack Remix" (featuring Yung Simmie and Young Renegade)

 Juicy J - Blue Dream & Lean Reloaded 
 01. "20 Zig Zags" (featuring Wiz Khalifa)

 Robb Banks - 
 "Refined"

 Denzel Curry -
 "Mystical Virus Pt. 2"

 Knocka - 
 "Watch Out"

 A$AP TyY- 
 "Ryder Shit"

2013 

 A$AP Rocky - LONG.LIVE.A$AP
 17. "Pretty Flacko (Remix)" (featuring Gucci Mane, Waka Flocka Flame, and Pharrell)

 Chris Travis - Side Effects 
 03. "Diamonds Pt. 2"

 Chris Travis - K.O.T.U. Greatest Hits 
 24. "Anything You Wanna Do"

 Grandmilly - BVNDVNVZ II 
 14. "Zombies"

 Gangsta Boo -  
 "Vibin’"

 Dough Dough Da Don - Century of a Raider 
 08. "Know Bout Me" (featuring SpaceGhostPurrp as Muney Jordan) (produced as Muney Jordan)

 Denzel Curry - 
 "Live This Shit"

 Yung Simmie - Shut Up and Vibe Vol. 1 
 15. "Disrespect" (featuring SpaceGhostPurrp)

 Nell - The Revolution '94  
 13. "The Outro"

 Lil Champ FWAY -
 "Graveyard Shift" (featuring Yung Simmie and Denzel Curry)

 Robb Banks - Tha City 
 01. "Flex (City)" (produced with Nuri) 
 02. "KDia (CT)" (featuring Phlo Finister) (produced with Nuri) 
 04. "All The Way Live (Ft. Lauderdale)" (produced with Nuri) 
 05. "Counted (LA)" (produced with Nuri) 
 08. "Changed (Miami)" (featuring Lofty305) (produced with Nuri and Freebase) 
 11. "Broward County Legend (Coral Springs)"

 Black Smurf - 
 "Pretty Thuggin"

 Da Mafia 6ix - 6ix Commandments 
 07. "Murder On My Mind" (featuring SpaceGhostPurrp, Krayzie Bone, and Bizzy Bone) (produced with DJ Paul and JGRXXN)

 Sokół and Marysia Starosta - Czarna biała magia
 01. "Proporcje" (scratches: DJ Nelson)
 11. "Chujowo wyszło" (scratches: DJ. B)

2014 

 Lil Uzi Vert - Purple Thoughtz EP Vol. 1 
02. "White Shit"

 Nell - Vice City 
 11. "Bust Ya Head Open" (featuring T-Rone, Big Bo, and Denzel Curry) 
 12. "Breaker Breaker"

 Black Kray - 
 "Lil Rari"

 Goth Money Records - Goth Money Tech Palms For The 99-2005
 03. "Goth Money World" (performed by Black Kray featuring SpaceGhostPurrp)

 Chris Travis - Silence of Me Eternally 
 04. "Just Ashin"

2015 

 Kane Grocerys - 777 
 02. "Taliban World" (featuring Black Kray)

 Robb Banks - Year of the Savage
 11. "2PhoneShawty"

 Amber London - 
 "Addicts"

 Thouxanbanfauni - 
 "Nue Nue II (NUER) (featuring RixkyB@NDS)"

2016 

 Cursed - 6 Shots 
 01. "6 Shots"

 Chxpo x Black Kray So Icey Goth La Flexico's"

 Syringe - 
 "Black Lips Rigging Shit"

 2017 
 Chxpo - 
 "Demon"

 SpookyLi - ICX CRXVM DXMON 1.8 
 All eight tracks produced by SpaceGhostPurrp

 SpookyLi - 
 "Sub-Zero"

 5G - LOR5TH 
 13. "Different States"

 Lil Tracy - 
 "Danglin"

 SpookyLi - Underworld EP All five tracks produced by SpaceGhostPurrp, Track 5 remixed by BMB Loko Los

 Diamondsonmydick - Bloodrayne 
03. "Bloodrayne"

 KirbLaGoop - Trapped In Da 100 
 05. "Jaw Lock"

 2018 

 Marcy Mane and WifiGawd - MOETOWN 
 08. "Holditdownmoe" (performed by Phlegm and Marcy Mane)

 TrippJones - Machine Smoke 
 12. "MachineDream" (featuring Morgue!)

 Black Kray and FHN Mook - Depressed Shooter 05. "Semi"

 AGoff - Trap Files 1006. "I'm Not Free"

 2019 

 XVNNY - Please Don't Wake Me; I Am Exhausted'' 
 Full album

References

External links
 

1991 births
Living people
African-American male rappers
African-American record producers
American hip hop record producers
4AD artists
People on the autism spectrum
Southern hip hop musicians
Underground rappers
Experimental hip hop
Rappers from Miami
Phonk musicians
Rappers
People from Carol City, Florida
21st-century American rappers
21st-century American male musicians
21st-century African-American musicians
Rappers from Florida